Choteč is a municipality and village in Prague-West District in the Central Bohemian Region of the Czech Republic. It has about 400 inhabitants.

History
The first written mention of the village of Choteč is from 1336. However, a creek and a forest named Choteč were mentioned already in 1115. The village was founded at the beginning of the 14th century.

References

Villages in Prague-West District